City on the Moon is a science fiction novel by Murray Leinster. This story was first published by Avalon Books in 1957. City on the Moon forms part of the To the Stars series by the same author, with two preceding books being Space Platform and Space Tug. It was released in 1958 by Ace Books under authority from Thomas Bouregy  & Co using their  Ace Double imprint reference number D-277.  The novel details the events that unfold subsequent to an apparent sabotage attempt made against a lunar jeep on its return journey to the multinational civilian lunar city.

Plot introduction
Joe Kenmore is thrust into a hero role when an attempt to destroy the lunar jeep he and his co-pilot friend Moreau is thwarted through their speedy reaction. They rush their damaged jeep back to the civilian lunar base only to discover that an incoming rocket from Earth cannot obtain a landing beam to guide it in. The rocket has some surprise occupants and events start to escalate rapidly.

Blurb
Further progress in atomic power could now come about only as a result of experiments so dangerous that they could only be carried on in an isolated space station hanging near the far side of the Moon. If these experiments succeeded, they could open the way to the stars. 

To supply this space laboratory was the duty of the City on the Moon. And when Joe Kenmore, Moon colonist, realised that there were agents working actively to sabotage the city, he knew he was up against a supreme crisis of humanity – one in which his own life and those of his fellow colonists were mere pawns to be sacrificed ruthlessly by that hidden foe – unless he personally could block their super-atomic deviltry.

External links
 Ed Emshwiller Cover at ISFDB

1957 American novels
1957 science fiction novels
American science fiction novels
Space exploration novels
Novels set on the Moon
Books with cover art by Ed Emshwiller
Avalon Books books